is a skyscraper in Chūō-ku, Niigata, Japan.

On the 20th floor, there is an observatory, offering a 360-degree view of the city, Shinano River, Sea of Japan, and Sado Island.

Gallery

Access
It takes about 10 minutes on foot from Niigata Station Bandai Exit.

Bus
The Bandai City bus stop (Stop No. 03) on the Bandai-bashi Line BRT is located near the building. The Niigata Nippo Media Ship bus stop is also served by the Niigata City Loop Bus.

See also
 Bandai City
 Bandai Bridge
 Toki Messe
 Next21

References

External links

  

Skyscrapers in Japan
Buildings and structures in Niigata (city)
Commercial buildings completed in 2013
2013 establishments in Japan